Sheffield Hallam University Sports Park is a multipurpose sports venue in Sheffield that is owned and run by Sheffield Hallam University.

History 
The venue was opened in 1992 when Sheffield Hallam University officially gained university status. It has since been used by a variety of the university's sports teams including football and rugby league. In 2013 rugby league team Sheffield Eagles joined with SHU to form the Sheffield Hallam Eagles which acts as a reserve team for the Sheffield Eagles. In 2016 Sheffield Eagles became tenants while the Sheffield Olympic Legacy Stadium was being built.

Sports venues in Sheffield
Sheffield Hallam University